Krishan Chandra Singhal (born 1941) is an Indian pharmacologist and has been serving as founder vice chancellor of NIMS University, Jaipur, India.

Biography
Singhal was born on 16 June 1941 at Aligarh. He completed high school and the earned his BSc from Aligarh Muslim University. He once secured 2nd position in a competition organised under "Physical Culture Test’ in 1957-58 session. He did MBBS (1959 batch) and MD (1968) from King George Medical College, Lucknow; PhD (1976) from Sardar Patel Medical College, Bikaner and DSc (2001) from Aligarh Muslim University, Aligarh.

Career
He joined Department of Pharmacology, Jawaharlal Nehru Medical College of Aligarh Muslim University as Assistant Research Officer under a project of Indian Council of Medical Research on 29 January 1968. He then worked as Demonstrator (15 May 1968), appointed Lecturer (1969), Reader (30 March 1979) and Professor (3 May 1988). He became the ‘Chairman’, Department of Pharmacology, Jawaharlal Nehru Medical College from 8 August 1990 to 7 August 1996 and then from 8 August 1999 to 7 August 2002.

Scientific contributions
He has made extensive and highly significant contributions in the field of pharmacology. He established new methods for screening antifilarial agents using Setaria cervi as test organism. He is one of the foremost pioneers in the field of Indian Pharmacovigilance and organised many scientific meets in the field of Pharmacovigilance. He founded the Society of Pharmacovigilance, India (SoPI) in 1999.

Bibliography
 Manual for Practical exercises in Pharmacy
 Manual for Practical exercises in Experimental Pharmacology
 Textbook of Pharmacology, JP Brothers, Delhi, India

Family
He belonged to a family of learned physicians and scholars. This family is very well known in Aligarh as a "Doctor Family". His father Dr. Ganga Prasad Gupta was a leading practitioner in Aligarh. The lifelong companion, Professor Usha Singhal is a noted name in the field of Physiology. All his children and their spouses (sons-in-law and daughter-in-law) are also physicians and doctors. Apart from them, Dr. Singhal’s brother and sister-in-law are also celebrated practitioners in Aligarh.

Awards and ‘Orations’ delivered
 BC Sharma Memorial Research Award of Indian Medical Association (1975)
 SS Parmar Foundation Award of Indian Academy of Neuroscience (1984)
 Major General SL Bhatia Oration Award of Association of Physiologists and Pharmacologists of India (1995)
 Colonel RN Chopra Oration Award of Indian Pharmacological Society (1995)
 Platinum Jubilee Oration Award of Indian Science Congress Association (1996)
 G Achari Oration Award of Indian Pharmacological Society (2001)
 John Autian Oration Award of Society of Pharmacovigilance, India (2002)
 Distinguished Visiting Professor, University of Tennessee, (2005)

See also
 NIMS University, Jaipur
 PN Saxena, teacher
 Syed Ziaur Rahman, student

References

Living people
People from Aligarh
1941 births
Aligarh Muslim University alumni
Academic staff of Aligarh Muslim University
Founders of Indian schools and colleges
Indian pharmacologists
King George's Medical University alumni
University of Lucknow alumni